The Mali Davis Cup team represents Mali in Davis Cup tennis competition and are governed by the Fédération Malienne de Tennis.  They have not competed since 2004.

History
Mali competed in its first Davis Cup in 2001.  Their best result was second place in their Group IV pool in their debut year.

Last team (2004) 

 Amadou Diallo
 Mamatou Traoré (Captain-player)
 Madou Keita
 Mohamoud Diallo

See also
Davis Cup

External links

Davis Cup teams
Davis Cup
Davis Cup